Neocurtimorda nakanei is a species of beetle in the genus Neocurtimorda of the family Mordellidae. It was described in 1953 by Franciscolo.

References

Beetles described in 1953
Mordellidae